Cathal O'Grady (born 6 March 1977) is an Irish former boxer. He competed in the men's heavyweight event at the 1996 Summer Olympics.

References

External links
 

1977 births
Living people
Irish male boxers
Olympic boxers of Ireland
Boxers at the 1996 Summer Olympics
Sportspeople from County Kildare
Heavyweight boxers